Jayasimha I (641–673 CE) succeeded Kubja Vishnuvardhana as the king of Eastern Chalukyas. He had a long reign of 32 years, however we know of nothing important happening in his reign.

His younger brother Indra Bhattaraka succeeded him.

References 
 Durga Prasad, History of the Andhras up to 1565 A. D., P. G. Publishers, Guntur (1988)
 South Indian Inscriptions - http://www.whatisindia.com/inscriptions/
 Nilakanta Sastri, K.A. (1955). A History of South India, OUP, New Delhi (Reprinted 2002).

Eastern Chalukyas
641 births
673 deaths
Telugu monarchs
Hindu dynasties